Klaus Siebert (29 April 1955 – 24 April 2016) was a German biathlete and biathlon coach who raced for East Germany.

Career
At the 1980 Olympics in Lake Placid, New York, Siebert won a silver medal on the relay with the East German relay team. In the Biathlon World Championships, Siebert earned two gold medals with the East German relay team in 1978 and 1979, and a bronze medal from 1977. He also garnered three individual medals including a gold medal from the 20 km in 1979 and two bronzes from the 10 km in 1975 and 1978.

After retiring from competition he became a coach. He coached in Germany, China and Belarus. He returned to his coaching role with the Belarusian national biathlon team in January 2012 after spending much of the previous year ill with cancer. However, Siebert stepped down from this role ahead of the 2014-15 season due to health issues.

Siebert died in Altenberg, Germany on 24 April 2016 after a long battle with cancer, aged 60.

Biathlon results
All results are sourced from the International Biathlon Union.

Olympic Games
1 medal (1 silver)

World Championships
6 medals (3 gold, 3 bronze)

*During Olympic seasons competitions are only held for those events not included in the Olympic program.

Individual victories
8 victories (6 In, 2 Sp)

*Results are from UIPMB and IBU races which include the Biathlon World Cup, Biathlon World Championships and the Winter Olympic Games.

References

External links 
 
SGD Zinnwald

1955 births
2016 deaths
German male biathletes
Biathletes at the 1980 Winter Olympics
Olympic biathletes of East Germany
Medalists at the 1980 Winter Olympics
Olympic medalists in biathlon
Olympic silver medalists for East Germany
Biathlon World Championships medalists
German cross-country skiing coaches
German sports coaches
People from Erzgebirgskreis
Sportspeople from Saxony